Dakk-e Bahu (also Romanized as Dakk-e Bāhū and Dak-e Bāhū) is a village in Bahu Kalat Rural District, Dashtiari District, Chabahar County, Sistan and Baluchestan Province, Iran. At the 2006 census, its population was 565, in 130 families.

References 

Populated places in Chabahar County